C63 or C-63 may refer to:
 Caldwell 63, a planetary nebula
 Convention concerning Statistics of Wages and Hours of Work, 1938 of the International Labour Organization
 JNR Class C63, a proposed Japanese steam locomotive
 Lockheed C-63 Hudson, an American military transport aircraft
 Mercedes-AMG C 63, a German automobile
 Ruy Lopez, a chess opening